The Genève Rink Hockey Club is a roller hockey team from Geneva, Switzerland. It was founded in 1939 and won its 11th Swiss title in 2011.

Trophies
 11 Swiss Championship

External links
Genève RHC Official Website

Roller hockey clubs in Switzerland
Sports clubs established in 1939